Cividate al Piano (Bergamasque:  or ) is a town and comune in the province of Bergamo, in Lombardy, Italy.

In 1191 the municipal territory was the seat of the battle of Rudiano between the communes of Bergamo, supported by Cremona, and those of Brescia, supported by Milan.

The Italian tenor Eliodoro Bianchi was born in Cividate al Piano in 1773.

References

External links
Official website

Cities and towns in Lombardy